Justin de Dios (born July 7, 1998), better and commonly known by his mononym Justin, is a Filipino singer, songwriter, actor, dancer, YouTuber and creative director. He is the sub-vocalist, the youngest member and creative lead of the Filipino boy band SB19 and is managed under ShowBT Philippines.

Early life 
Justin de Dios was born on July 7, 1998, in Malabon City, Metro Manila, Philippines. He is the youngest child among three children. De Dios attended De La Salle College of Saint Benilde and graduated with a degree in Multimedia Arts.

Career

2016-2018: Pre-debut
In 2016, South Korean entertainment company ShowBT put up an office in the Philippines and opened a talent audition for Filipinos aspiring to become professional performers. De Dios was among the participants, and was chosen later on for a 5-piece boy band. De Dios then underwent South Korean-style training that is rampant for K-Pop bands prior to debut, which included voice and dance classes, body conditioning, personality development, and the like. De Dios recalled his training while working to finish his thesis in college wherein the group would practice a song and dance routine 30 times a day, with the aim of reaching 1,000 practices for 9 hours a day. According to his brother in a series of twitter post, he revealed that "...I remember Justin crying inside his room because he wanted to quit college[...]He really wanted to become an artist." Due to his eagerness to become an artist, he submitted several audition pieces to different companies in which he struggled to pass. This gave time for him to finish college and eventually graduated with honors. De Dios used his music inspirations as medium for his performances during his training sessions, mentioning Filipino RnB singer-songwriter Michael Pangilinan and South Korean boy band Got7 among them. He also admired South Korean boy band Astro, BTS and South Korean girl group Twice. After rigorous training, he received a slot for the final line-up for SB19 as the sub-vocalist.

2018-2021: Debut as SB19 and breakthrough 

On 26 October 2018, De Dios debuted with fellow members Pablo, Stell, Josh, and Ken as P-Pop group known as SB19. He was launched as the group's visual and sub-vocalist. Their group name, they say, is meant to represent a partnership between the Philippines and South Korea. The “SB” comes from their company name, ShowBT, while “19” is actually the total of each digit of the Philippines and South Korea's country codes – 63 and 82 (6+3+8+2 = 19). The members added that “SB” also stands for “sound break,” which represents their goal of breaking into the Philippine and international music scene. Their first single "Tilaluha" was written by fellow member Pablo but its success was not widely acclaimed. With a message centered on heartbreak and unrequited love, the song was intended to introduce the band and their powerful vocals in which it debuted poorly to charts. The initial poor reception for the group and their singles leads to them almost splitting up. SB19's second single "Go Up" was released on July 19, 2019. They described the song as their "last shot" or their redemption because they had decided to disband if their career did not progress after. Unexpectedly, they gained public attention after the dance practice video of the song was uploaded which was later  became trending topics on Twitter and Facebook. Opportunities opened and the group started to appear in multiple radio and television outlets, both local and internationally. According to De Dios in a live interview on their success,

"...Of course there’s happiness, because although we’re in a situation like this, we can release an album and inspire people. At the same time, it’s sad because a lot of things are happening, a lot of people are going through hard times[...]the least that we can do is inspire them through what we can do."

In 2020, they released their debut album 'Get in the Zone' which was a success locally. In the same year, they appeared at number six on Billboard Year-End Social 50 chart, making them the first Southeast Asian act to reach the top 10 of the magazine's annual chart.

In February 5, 2021, De Dios appeared as a music video actor for "Yakap", a Sony Music Philippines-produced song by hip-hop artist Alex Bruce.

In 2021, he served as the creative director of "What?", the first single of their extended play Pagsibol. Justin was involved mostly on this side of the band's music production as manifested in their previous music video "Hanggang sa Huli". He also served as a co-creative director for the "Pagsibol" merchandise project, pitching in his input for all the studies and acting as liaison for the rest of the group when it comes to creative decisions. The mini-album gave the group multiple awards at the 2021 MYX Music Awards bagging Artist of the Year, and Song and Music Video of the Year for their track, "Alab (Burning)". In the same year, SB19 became the first Filipino and Southeast Asian act to be nominated in Billboard Music Awards for Top Social Artist along with BTS, Blackpink, Ariana Grande, and Seventeen—which BTS won. It marked the first-ever appearance of a Filipino artist in the Billboard Music Awards.

2022-present: Continued success and recent projects

In January 2022, the group's hit track “Bazinga” remained in the number one spot in the Billboard Hot Trending Songs for seven weeks.

The group recently released their new single Where You At (WYAT) in August 2022, in which a world tour Where You At Tour will kick off in September 2022.

On November 30, 2022, De Dios won as Best Visual of the year under Male Group category at the recently held 7thPpopawards2022 where his group also bagged 3 wins.

Discography

Product where his group also baggedion credits 
All song credits are adapted from the Tidal, unless otherwise noted.

Awards and nominations

References 

SB19 members
1998 births
Living people
Filipino singer-songwriters
English-language singers from the Philippines
21st-century Filipino male singers
Filipino male pop singers
Filipino male dancers
Filipino male models
Filipino dance musicians
Sony Music Philippines artists
ShowBT Entertainment artists